The Thingangyun Sanpya Hospital is one of the major public hospitals in Yangon.
It is a 500-bed hospital for 1.3 million population. It is also a teaching hospital affiliated with University of Medicine 2, Yangon.

History
Construction of the hospital was started on 2 April 1991 and finished on 31 March 1994. Health services were provided in the hospital since 21 May 1994.

Catchment areas
Six areas are under catchment areas of the hospital.
 Thingangyun
 South Dagon
 North Dagon
 Thuwanna
 South Okkalapa
 Tamwe

Specialist unit
The leading specialty with the highest number of admission in 2009 were medical ward followed by OG, surgical and child ward. 
 Medical Ward	
 Surgical Ward	
 Obstetrics & Gynaecology (OG) Ward	
 Child Medical Ward	
 Child Surgical Ward	
 Orthopaedic Ward	
 Uro-Surgical Ward	
 Uro-Medical Ward	
 Gastrointestinal Ward	 	 
 Chest Medical Ward
 Chest Surgical Ward
 Eye Ward
 Psychiatric OPD
 Ear, Nose & Throat (ENT) OPD
 Dental OPD
 Nuclear Medicine OPD
 Physiotherapy OPD

Supportive departments
 Anaesthesia & ICU	
 Pathology & Blood Bank	
 Radiology (X-ray, USG, MRI, CT)	
 Medicosocial Work	
 Pharmacy & Medical Store
 Autoclave
 Gas Station
 Kitchen & Laundry
 Mortuary

Teaching programs 
Thingangyun Sanpya Hospital is one of the teaching hospitals of the University of Medicine 2, Yangon.
 Undergraduate Training
 3rd Year
 Final Part II 
 House Surgeon Training
 Post Graduate Training
 Diploma & Master Courses

See also
 List of hospitals in Yangon

References

Hospitals in Yangon
Hospitals established in 1994